Heidemarie is a given name. Notable people with the name include:

 Heidemarie Bártová (born 1965), female diver from the Czech Republic
 Heidemarie Fuentes, American actress and producer
 Heidemarie Hatheyer (1918–1990), Austrian film actress
 Heidemarie Stefanyshyn-Piper (born 1963), American Naval officer and former NASA astronaut
 Heidemarie Steiner (born 1944), German figure skater and coach
 Heidemarie Wieczorek-Zeul (born 1942), German politician (SPD)

Fictional characters
 Heidemarie W. Schnaufer, a character from the anime/manga Strike Witches

German feminine given names